Novoselivka is an urban-type settlement in Kramatorsk Raion of Donetsk Oblast, Ukraine. It is part of Lyman urban hromada, one of the hromadas of Ukraine. Its population is approximately

References

Urban-type settlements in Kramatorsk Raion